Stereotypes of white people in the United States are misleading generalizations about the character, behavior, or appearance of white Americans by other Americans in the United States.  For stereotypes about Americans by people of other nationalities,  see Stereotypes of Americans.

Stereotype

Social stereotypes

In general, stereotypes of white people portray upper class white Americans as WASPs and they portray lower class white Americans as "backward", "barely-educated" rednecks.

Academic studies

An early study of stereotypes of white people found in works of fiction which were written by African-American authors was conducted by African-American sociologist Tilman C. Cothran in 1950.  The top five stereotypical qualities of whites that Cothran noted in his research were: 

Other stereotypical qualities he listed were "think they know the Negro," "unfair deceitful, tricky," "think it's a white man's world" and "cowardly." In another study on stereotypes in 1951, Tilman observed that the black lower and upper classes at that time had the least favorable stereotypes about white people, and the black middle class the most favorable.

In a 1972 study, American whites were stereotyped as "materialistic and pleasure loving" when compared with Asian and African Americans.  In a study among college students of different races in 1982, White Americans were described as materialistic, ambitious, intelligent, conventional, industrious, and conservative. The study's author noted that the white stereotype had decreased in favorability over the years while the black stereotype had increased.

White women were described as attractive, blonde, ditsy, shallow, privileged, sexually available, and appearance-focused by non-white participants in a 2013 study. The author of the paper also found that the stereotypes were consistent with media images of white women and noted the relative scarcity of research on white American stereotypes compared to research on other racial stereotypes.

In a 2018 study of children of different races, six year olds chose photos of white men as being "really smart" over photos of white women or black and brown people.

Popular culture 

Becky and Karen have been used as terms to refer to white women who act in a clueless, condescending or entitled way. Kyle refers to a stereotype of an angry white teenage boy who consumes energy drinks, punches holes into drywall, and plays video games.

The blog Stuff White People Like, written by a white man and an Asian man, addressed early 21st century stereotypes of white hipster bohemians in a humorous way. Comedian Dave Chappelle also used humor to address the stereotype that white Americans cannot dance in a sketch in which groups of whites erupt into frenzied dancing every time they hear an electric guitar.

Negative portrayals of specific groups of white people 

As the social definition of "white people" has changed over the years, studies have shown that members of different races, ethnicities, and nationalities have different stereotypes of white people. Before the 1980s, ethnic groups such as the Irish, Italians, Armenians, and Polish people were portrayed in popular media and culture in a negative fashion. Stereotypes of West Virginians and Alabamians include incest and inbreeding. Poor whites in the Appalachian region have often been stereotyped as hillbillies. White Hispanic and Latino Americans are often overlooked by the U.S. mass media and frequently, American social perceptions incorrectly give the terms "Hispanic or Latino" a racial value, usually mixed-race, such as Mestizo, while they, in turn, are overrepresented in the U.S. Hispanic mass media, are admired by it, and shape social perceptions of Hispanic and Latino Americans.

See also

 Acting white
 Angry white male
 Anti-Americanism
 Basic (slang)
 Becky
 Buckra
 Crackers
 Hillbilly
 Karen
 NASCAR dad
 Neanderthals
 Potato salad
 Redneck joke
 Soccer mom
 Starbucks
 Stereotype
 Stuff White People Like
 Toast sandwich
 Trailer trash
 Trixie
 US stereotypes
 Valley girl
 Veganism
 White fragility
 White guilt
 White nationalism
 White privilege
 White supremacy
 White trash
 Whites
 Wigger

References